True False is a 2019 studio album by American experimental rock band Negativland. It has received positive reception from critics. It is a companion piece to 2020's The World Will Decide.

Reception
The editorial staff of AllMusic Guide gave the release four out of five stars, with reviewer Paul Simpson summing it up as "both absurdly humorous and frighteningly relevant". S. David of Tiny Mix Tapes gave True False four out of five, writing that the dense lyrics with their attempt to expose "false dichotomies" "mostly succeeds" and pointing out the humor in the recording.

Track listing
"Either Or"– 0:47
"Limbo"– 4:14
"Discernment"– 4:30
"Certain Men"– 4:59
"Melt the North Pole"– 3:03
"Fourth of July"– 3:37
"Mounting the Puppy"– 3:02
"One Bee at a Time"– 2:53
"Secret Win"– 0:55
"Destroying Anything"– 5:04
"Cadillac"– 5:18
"This Is Not Normal"– 3:29
"Yesterday Hates Today"– 1:43
"True False"– 9:38
Vinyl LP bonus tracks
"Melt the North Pole" (Flat Version)– 3:21
"This Is Not Normal" (Normal Version)– 8:00

Personnel
Negativland
Ian Allen– composition, performance, production, recording, mixing, and editing
Peter Conheim– composition, performance, production, recording, mixing, and editing
Mark Hosler– composition, performance, production, recording, mixing, and editing
Don Joyce– composition, performance, production, recording, mixing, and editing
Jon Leidecker– composition, performance, production, recording, mixing, and editing
Richard Lyons– composition, performance, production, recording, mixing, and editing
David Wills– composition, vocals, performance, production, recording, mixing, and editing

Additional personnel
Thomas Dimuzio– mastering
Nava Dunkelman– percussion on "Yesterday Hates Today"
Dan Lynch– cover, label and booklet paintings
Ava Mendoza– guitar on "Mounting the Puppy"
The Not Normal Animal Chorus– vocals on "This Is Not Normal"
Aasha
Beatrice
Dee Dee
Méabh de Siún
Neela
Ruby
Savanna
Stella
Vivian
Prairie Prince– drums on "Discernment" and "Melt the North Pole"
M. C. Schmidt– prepared piano on "Destroying Anything"

References

External links

2019 albums
Negativland albums
Seeland Records albums